The Vartholomio – Loutra Kyllinis railway line was a meter gauge railway line of the Piraeus, Athens and Peloponnese Railways (SPAP). It branched off the Kavasila–Kyllini railway line at the railway station of Vartholomio, 1 km north of the town at km 5.895 of that line.

The Vartholomio – Loutra Kyllinis line was opened on 1 June 1892. Its construction coincided with the start of the exploitation of the hot springs at Loutra Kyllinis (the name means "Kyllini baths") by the SPAP, which constructed spa facilities, hotels and parks there. The line was shut down in 1969.

The line was first known as the Vartholomio–Lintzi line, as Loutra Kyllinis was previously known by the name of Lintzi.

Stations
Vartholomio
Vranas
Lygia
Arkoudi
Loutra Kyllinis

Elis
Railway lines in Greece
Kastro-Kyllini
Vartholomio
Metre gauge railways in Greece